Igor Jovanović (born 3 May 1989) is a Croatian-born footballer who holds German citizenship.

Club career
Prior to the season of 2013 Jovanović signed a contract with FF Jaro of the Finnish Veikkausliiga In June 2014 he signed a contract with the Polish club MKS Miedz Legnica after three weeks he transferred to the Israeli Premier League club Bnei Sakhnin.

In 2020, he played as a defender for Seongnam.

In July 2021, he signed with Lithuanian FK Sūduva.

In January 2022, he signed a six-month contract with Romanian club Dinamo București.

References

External links
 
 Guardian Football
 
 
 

1989 births
Living people
Footballers from Zagreb
Association football central defenders
Croatian footballers
SV Wacker Burghausen players
1. FC Kleve players
Turun Palloseura footballers
SV Babelsberg 03 players
FC Rot-Weiß Erfurt players
FF Jaro players
Miedź Legnica players
Bnei Sakhnin F.C. players
FC Lahti players
Sepsi OSK Sfântu Gheorghe players
Panetolikos F.C. players
Seongnam FC players
FC Astra Giurgiu players
FK Sūduva Marijampolė players
FC Dinamo București players
FC Brașov (2021) players
Regionalliga players
Veikkausliiga players
3. Liga players
I liga players
Israeli Premier League players
Liga I players
Super League Greece players
K League 1 players
A Lyga players
Liga II players
Croatian expatriate footballers
Expatriate footballers in Finland
Expatriate footballers in Poland
Expatriate footballers in Israel
Expatriate footballers in Romania
Expatriate footballers in Greece
Expatriate footballers in South Korea
Expatriate footballers in Lithuania
Croatian expatriate sportspeople in Finland
Croatian expatriate sportspeople in Poland
Croatian expatriate sportspeople in Israel
Croatian expatriate sportspeople in Greece
Croatian expatriate sportspeople in Romania
Croatian expatriate sportspeople in Lithuania